Vysoká Srbská is a municipality and village in Náchod District in the Hradec Králové Region of the Czech Republic. It has about 300 inhabitants. It is located on the border with Poland.

Administrative parts
Villages of Závrchy and Zlíčko are administrative parts of Vysoká Srbská.

References

Villages in Náchod District